The Baltimore Beacon is a white-painted stone beacon positioned high above the channel between the mainland and Sherkin Island near the entrance to the harbour at Baltimore, County Cork, Ireland.

A beacon was built at the order of the British government following the 1798 Rebellion. 
It is part of a series of lighthouses and beacons dotted around the Irish coast, forming a warning system.

The beacon is locally known as "Lot's Wife", after the Biblical woman turned into a pillar of salt.

The current beacon was constructed in 1848. 

The beacon is approximately fifty feet (15.2m) high and fifteen feet (4.6m) in diameter at the base. 

Towards the end of July 1847, Commander James Wolfe, R.N., informed the Ballast Board that he had recently completed a survey of Baltimore, County Cork Harbour and noticed the destruction of the Beacon on the eastern point of the southern entrance to the harbour. George Halpin, the Board's inspector was ordered to report the matter which he did the following month, stating that the original, locally built Beacon was too small, poorly built and had been vandalised. He recommended a large and properly constructed Beacon with which the Board concurred.

Almost a year passed, 6th July 1848, before the Board requested the secretary to seek permission from Lord Carbery for a piece of ground thirty feet in diameter, on which to build the Beacon. By the end of July a reply had been received from Mr. Arthur Perry-Aylmer informing the Board that Lady Carbery of Castle Freke near Rosscarbery had given her full permission to either rebuild or re-construct the existing Beacon and granted free access as the Beacon was a matter of such vast importance to fishermen and others.

By February 1849 inspector George Halpin reported that the masonry work of the Beacon was complete but the iron staff and vane still had to be placed on top.
The vent[sic:vane?], mentioned by Halpin in 1849 was obviously[?] vulnerable and at a later date was replaced by a sphere.

Sherkin Island Lighthouse 

"From around 1881, the Skibbereen and Baltimore Harbour Board were petitioned to erect a lighthouse at the entrance to Baltimore Harbour. A local priest and board member, Fr. Charles Davis, was the chief agitator for this. There was a nasty rock, Loo Rock, some 75 feet by 25 feet, at the entrance to the harbour and he claimed that many fishermen were afraid of entering the harbour by day, let alone by night, because of the fear of foundering on this hazard. Local fishermen, as well as fishing captains from Arklow and the Isle of Man (who far outnumbered the former) were all in agreement that a lighthouse was essential to the future viability of the harbour and the increase in harbour dues would soon pay for the cost of a lighthouse."

"And so, with the blessing of the Board, Fr. Davis prevailed upon the Commissioners of Irish Lights to provide them with a lighthouse that the local harbour board could run and Irish Lights acceded to his request."

The lighthouse on Sherkin Island was completed in 1885.

"Baltimore, in all probability, will become ultimately the head-quarters of the Southern
Mackerel Fishery, as from its position, the fishing grounds can be reached from it
with less delay than from other harbours.

Although, by day, there is no difficulty in vessels reaching the anchorage ground at
Baltimore, there being a beacon placed at the southern entrance, for their guidance, yet on
dark, stormy nights, it is very dangerous for them to attempt to do so ; and it has been
represented by some of the fishermen that, from the above cause, on several occasions
they had been forced to abandon all attempts to enter the harbour—and had to keep
at sea—riding out heavy gales.

This would be obviated if a light were placed for their guidance in some conspicuous
place, and we cannot too strongly urge upon the authorities the importance of the question."

from the Report of the Sea and Inland Fisheries - 1881

See also
 Lighthouses in Ireland
 Martello tower

References

External links 

 Irish National Inventory of Architectural Heritage 
 Pete's Irish Lighthouses
  
 General Lighthouse Authorities of UK and Ireland - Aids to Navigation Review 2010 - 2015
 Report of the Sea and Inland Fisheries - 1881 see note on the need for a light at Baltimore harbour among other details
 Baltimore Town - tourist information
 K513 - Baltimore Beacon - photograph and information
 Baltimore, Co. Cork - Wikishire 
 The Algiers Inn pub Baltimore history - shipwreck history 

Baltimore, County Cork
Beacon towers